Khaled Hadj Ibrahim (born 29 February 1960), better known by his mononym Khaled, is an Algerian raï singer, musician and songwriter. He began recording in his early teens under the name Cheb Khaled (Arabic for "Young" Khaled, with "Cheb" as a common title for male raï singers).

Khaled is one of the most important musicians in the history of Raï music in his native Algeria and is one the world's best-known Arab singers. To date, Khaled has sold over 80.5 million albums (10 diamond, platinum, and gold) worldwide, making him one of the bestselling Arabic-language singers in history. Among his most famous songs are "Aïcha", "Didi", "El Arbi", "Abdel Kader", "La Poupée qui fait non", "Wahran Wahran", "Bakhta", "C'est la vie", and "Alech Taadi".

He holds the Guinness World Record for best-selling artist of raï music.

Early life 
Khaled Hadj Ibrahim was born on 29 February 1960 in Oran's Eckmühl neighborhood, Algeria.

Musical career 

His rise to national fame was mainly due to the efforts of Lieutenant-Colonel Hosni Snoussi, director of the state-supported arts and culture Office Riadh el Feth, who took Khaled under his wing and invited him along with other rai stars to perform at the state-sponsored Festival de la Jeunesse pour la Fête Nationale in Algiers in July 1985. In the same year, he was crowned king of rai in the first official festival of rai which was staged in Oran.

Hosni Snoussi and Martin Meissonnier, who met at the Festival, convinced France's Minister of Culture Jack Lang that the export of rai from Algeria to France was in the French government's interest and together they organized the first rai festival in France at Bobigny in 1986. Cheb Khaled, who had been avoiding his mandatory military service, was able to perform at Bobigny only after Colonel Snoussi intervened with the Algerian military authorities to secure him a passport. Shortly thereafter, Snoussi arranged for Cheb Khaled to record in France, with funding from the Office Riadh el Feth. The album, Kutché, released in 1988, a collaboration between Khaled and the Algerian jazz musician Safy Boutella, expanded his reputation in France, where he soon settled.

In 1992, having dropped the "Cheb" from his performance name, he recorded Khaled, which was produced by Don Was. The album's first single Didi, which was a major hit in Europe, the Arab World, and in South and East Asia, made him an international superstar.

International impact 

One of the Pioneers of world music, Rai musician Khaled has gone beyond all geo-political boundaries to become one of the world's most popular performers, mixing traditional Algerian music with western rhythms and styles such as soul, rock and reggae to achieve his distinctive sound and voice unlike anyone ever.
Khaled has been celebrated not only for his music, but for his role as a builder of bridges between cultures. selling more than 80 millions copies around the world makes him a nationwide celebrity and unofficial ambassador for the country's Arab minority.
—Food and Agriculture Organization of the United Nations, Rome, 2008 

Khaled's signature song, the 1993 hit "Didi", became extremely popular in the Arabic-speaking countries and also in several other continents, including Europe, where it entered top charts in France, Belgium and Spain, and in Asia, including India and Pakistan. The song was also used in the Bollywood films Shreeman Aashiq, Airlift and Highway. Khaled and producer Don Was appeared on The Tonight Show on 4 February 1993.

Khaled returned to the America in December 2004 for a special guest performance at the Grammy Jam 2004 in Los Angeles, California. He joined a cast of celebrity artists honoring the great musical legends Earth, Wind & Fire, performing Brazilian Rhymes into Didi showing how their music crossed the world, fusing with his North African style.

In 2012 Khaled's album C’est la vie sold more than one million copies in the European market, 1.8 million copies in the Middle East and North Africa, and over 4 million copies worldwide. The album reached number 5 on SNEP, the official French Albums Chart.

On 3 April 2015, Khaled was convicted for plagiarism of Didi, from Angui ou Selmi, a musical composition recorded by Cheb Rabah (born Rabah Zerradine) in 1988. But on 13 May 2016, Court of Cassation removed the charges against Khaled, when a 1982 audio tape with the song was shown. This tape was recorded by Khaled and given to a producer located in Oran, 6 years before Cheb Rabah's record. In the end, Rabah had to compensate Khaled for the fees during this case.

Personal life 

On the 12th of January, 1995, Khaled married 27 year old Samira Diabi. Together, they have four daughters and one son.

In 1997, his wife filed a complaint against him for domestic violence, before retracting the complaint.

In 1998, the biography Khaled: Derrière le sourire (French for "Khaled: Behind the Smile") was published, which recounted his life.

Khaled has an illegitimate son with whom he has no contact. Before a court appearance in 2001, he denied being the father of the child, continuing to claim that he had been "deceived". On the 7th May, 2001, Khaled was sentenced by the Nanterre criminal court to a two-month suspended prison sentence for "family desertion". His move to Luxembourg in 2008, where he's been residing ever since, has reportedly been motivated by these charges.

He was awarded Moroccan citizenship in August 2013, which he didn't ask for but accepted because he felt he could not refuse.

Discography 
This discography does not include a number of albums released on cassette in Algeria early in his career, and several bootleg/unofficial albums.

Studio albums

Live albums 
 Solo

 Collaboration

Compilation albums 
 1991: Le Meilleur de Cheb Khaled
 1994: Le Meilleur de Cheb Khaled 2
 2005: Forever King
 2005: Spirit of Rai
 2006: Maghreb Soul – Cheb Khaled Story 1986–1990
 2007: Best of Khaled
 2009: Rebel of Raï – The Early Years

Singles

Featured in
(charting hits only)

Appearances

Soundtracks

Filmography
 1997 100% Arabica
 1997 Le Centre de visionnage
 2003 Art'n Acte Production
 2004 We Are the Future

Honors 
 First Arab singer to win World Music Awards (1992).
 First Arab singer to hold a Guinness World Record for Best-selling artist of raï music (2000).
 Only Arab singer to perform at Fifa World Cup ceremony (2010).
 FAO goodwill ambassador.
 Only Arab singer to perform at European Athletics Championships (2006).
 Was named top 50 Voices in the World by NPR.
 Is decorated « Chevalier  des arts et des lettres »
 First Rai singer to be named Cheb in 1974 which means (young man), and then all rai singers named (Cheb) or (Cheba) after Khaled.
 First and only Arab singer to perform in many countries all over the world such as USA, Canada, Japan (1989), Netherlands, Turkey (1996), Germany, Portugal (2018), Italy, Brazil (2000), Spain, England, Denmark, Norway, Switzerland, Mauritius (2014), Slovenia, Eihiopia (2014), South Africa (2010), Senegal (2014), India (1992), Greece (2006), Hungary  and Luxembourg.
 Only Arab singer to chart in France, Sweden, Belgium, USA, Netherlands, Germany, Switzerland, Austria, Slovakia. 
 First Arab singer to chart in Billboards Hot 100.
 First Arab singer to chart in France Charts.
 First Arab singer to chart in European Hot 100 singles (2009). 
 First and Only Arab singer to chart in a latin american country Brazil for the song (El Arbi) 
 Only Arab Musician to win Cesar Award (1994).
 Only Arab (Musician) to Win Venice Film Festival award (1993).
 Most-singing Arab singer in L'Olympia in Paris (5 times).
Sold over 80.5 million albums (10 diamond, platinum, and gold) worldwide.
 Considered one of the most-selling Arab singers of all time.

Awards
{| class="wikitable sortable plainrowheaders" 
|-
! scope="col" | Award
! scope="col" | Year
! scope="col" | Nominee(s)
! scope="col" | Category
! scope="col" | Result
! scope="col" class="unsortable"| 
|-
!scope="row" rowspan=2|BBC Radio 3 Awards for World Music
| 2004
| rowspan=2|Himself
| rowspan=2|Middle East and North Africa
| 
| 
|-
| 2005
| 
| 
|-
!scope="row"|César Awards
| 1994
| 1, 2, 3, Sun
| Best Original Music
| 
| 
|-
!scope="row"|GQ Awards
| 2019
| Himself
| Legend Award
| 
| 
|-
!scope="row" rowspan=2|Kora Awards
| 1997
| rowspan=2|Himself
| rowspan=2|Best Male Artist of North Africa
| 
| 
|-
| 2012
| 
| 
|-
!scope="row"|NRJ Music Awards
| 2010
| Khaled, Raï'n'B, Magic System
| Francophone Duo/Group of the Year
| 
| 
|-
!scope="row"|Venice Film Festival
| 1993
| 1, 2, 3, Sun
| Golden Osella for Best Music
| 
| 
|-
!scope="row" rowspan=4|Victoires de la Musique
| 1995
| rowspan=2|Himself
| rowspan=2|Francophone Artist or Group of the Year
| 
| 
|-
| rowspan=2|1997
| 
| rowspan=2|
|-
| "Aïcha"
| Original Song of the Year
| 
|-
| 2013
| C'est la vie
| World Music Album of the Year
| 
| 
|-
!scope="row" rowspan=7|World Music Awards
| 1997
| Himself
| World's Best Selling African Artist of the Year
| 
| 
|-
| 2000
| Khaled, Rachid Taha, Faudel
| World's Best Selling Arabic Act
| 
| 
|-
| rowspan=5|2014
| rowspan=4|Himself
| World's Best Selling Algerian Artist
| 
| 
|-
| World's Best Male Artist
| 
| 
|-
| World's Best Live Act
| 
| 
|-
| World's Best Entertainer 
| 
| 
|-
| C'est la vie
| World's Best Album 
| 
| 

 1985: First Prize of Rai Music (KING) Oran
 1989: Best Song (chebba) in France
 1989: Top 100 Best Album in 20th Century (kutché)
 1992: Top 50 MTV America (didi)
 1992: MTV India Awards (didi)
 2004: Grammy Jam Awards (Khaled and Carlos Santana) ("Love to the people")
 2005: Montreal International Jazz Festival (The Antonio Carlos-Jobim Award)
 2005: ImagineNations and DC Internationals (Empowering Award, for spreading the message of peace)
 2006: The Mediterranean Prize for Creativity
 2008: Award Dutch Virsti - German Academy of Music
 2009: NME Awards 2009 (meilleur duo) avec Magic System
 2009: MGM Awards (highest-selling Arab album in history) (The legendary) (Las Vegas)
 2010: Big Apple Music Awards (best Arab artist selling in United States)
 2010: One of 50 Great Voices profiled by NPR
 2013: Murex D'Or 2013 – Best International Song & Best International Singer – Cheb Khaled – ("C'est La Vie")
 2013: Rabab d’or Prix d'honneur – Maroc Festival International Al Ansra de M’diq ("C'est La Vie")
 2013: Festival International de la Musique Kabyle à Tanger festival Touiza MAROC 2013 ("C'est La Vie")
 2016: XLII Universal Music Award - Vienna 2016 - for "C'est La Vie" as Best Song.

References

External links 
  
Article on Khaled by Paul Tingen
 
Khaled on Britannica
Chebkhaled Official - Instagram
Chebkhaled Official - YouTube

1960 births
Living people
Raï musicians
Folk-pop singers
Musicians from Oran
FAO Goodwill ambassadors
Algerian expatriates in France
20th-century Algerian male singers
21st-century Algerian male singers
Naturalized citizens of Morocco